Amos Youga (born 8 December 1992) is a professional footballer who plays as a central midfielder for Bulgarian First League club CSKA Sofia and the Central African Republic national team.

Youga started his career at Saint-Priest but soon made a move to Lyon, where he failed to break into the first team, playing only for the second squad. In 2013 he joined Vannes and remained there until June 2014 when signing for Gazélec Ajaccio of Ligue 2. In his first season at the club Youga earned promotion to the Ligue 1. He was a member of Gazélec Ajaccio's squad for three seasons and signed for Le Havre in 2017. Three years later, he moved to CSKA Sofia in Bulgaria.

Born in France, Youga made his international debut for Central African Republic in June 2013.

Personal life
Youga is the brother of the Central African international Kelly Youga, and the uncle of the French youth international footballer Willem Geubbels.

Career

Early career
A graduate of Saint-Priest's youth academy, Youga played one match in the Championnat National 3 in 2010–11 season, before joining Lyon in the summer of 2011. There he participated only for the second squad in the Championnat National 2, making 32 appearances for two seasons.

In June 2013, Youga joined Championnat National club Vannes. He enjoyed a successful season at Stade de la Rabine and quickly established himself as a first-team regular. On 25 February 2014, Youga scored first competitive goal in his career, netting the third in a 3–2 home win over Strasbourg.

Gazélec Ajaccio
In June 2014, Youga joined Gazélec Ajaccio of Ligue 2. In his first season at the club he earned promotion to the Ligue 1, scoring 2 goals in 32 league games. He made his Ligue 1 debut on 16 August 2015, playing full 90 minutes in a 2–0 away loss against Paris Saint-Germain. In his three seasons with the club he played 79 games and scored 4 goals.

Le Havre
In the summer of 2017 Youga signed with Le Havre.

CSKA Sofia
On 15 June 2020, Youga joined Bulgarian club CSKA Sofia. He made his debut on 7 August in a 2–2 away draw against CSKA 1948 on the opening day of the 2020–21 season.

International career
At the age of 20, Youga made his international debut for the Central African Republic in an 2014 FIFA World Cup qualification match against Botswana on 15 June 2013.

Career statistics

Club
.

International

Honours
CSKA Sofia
 Bulgarian Cup: 2020–21

References

External links

Amos Youga foot-national.com Profile

1992 births
Living people
French footballers
Citizens of the Central African Republic through descent
Central African Republic footballers
Central African Republic international footballers
Central African Republic expatriate footballers
French sportspeople of Central African Republic descent
Ligue 1 players
Ligue 2 players
Championnat National players
Championnat National 2 players
Championnat National 3 players
First Professional Football League (Bulgaria) players
FC Bourgoin-Jallieu players
AS Saint-Priest players
Vannes OC players
Gazélec Ajaccio players
Le Havre AC players
PFC CSKA Sofia players
Expatriate footballers in Bulgaria
Association football midfielders
People from Villeurbanne
Sportspeople from Lyon Metropolis
Footballers from Auvergne-Rhône-Alpes